Neulette is a commune in the Pas-de-Calais department of northern France. The inhabitants are called Neulettois.

See also
 Communes of the Pas-de-Calais department

References

Communes of Pas-de-Calais
Artois